Leonel Jules is a Contemporary Canadian painter from Montreal, Quebec, originally from Haiti. 
A graduate of the Université du Québec in Fine Arts, he has done research in history and semiotics of art. 
After receiving numerous awards and fellowships, he devoted himself to painting and the diffusion of art though Art-Media a television show, now a research center Art-Media whose mission is to educate and help discover contemporary art.

His approach as an artist led him to create territorial languages by the rhythmic movement of a «Carré Plastique». 
This specific movement in the painting is developed to reveal the structure and pictorial identity.
Such as a in game objects are animated in a «painterly vibe» where the elements are being created spontaneously. 
A particular space of improvisation progressing in an exploration painting's tools.

Community projects 

His approach is to build himself through color, texture, to glimpse in the field image and
portrayal of what we call identity. 
This image identity acquires a new dimension in the pictorial space 
that involves young and old students in an educational experience (Dazibao and arrimage)

Influences 
Paul Klee for his interest of drawing rhythms, graphics and above all a presence of spirituality which allows me to find my own African roots. Matisse for a profound discovery of color and collage. Riopelle and les Automatistes Québécois for the idea of a behavior in which I can find a personal energy by the gestures. And then there is inevitably... Picasso, especially his Guernica. In this case I can not speak of influence, but of convergence on how to find transcendence in painting, how to invoke the sky.

Recognition and awards 

2004-2005 Creation grant, SODAC
1989 Canadian Painters Award, Montreal 
1985 Gold Medal, Visual Arts National Competition  
1984 Silver Medal and Honourable Mention, Visual Arts National Competition

Collections 
Writer and professor of art Léonel Jules has been exposing for over 25 years. His works are in numerous private and public collections such as the Musée d'Art Contemporain de Montréal, the Musée de Joliette, Martineau Walker Collection, the Collection of the National Bank of Canada, Loto Québec Collection, Collection and Provigo in Montreal. Not to mention other private collections in Germany, Los Angeles, New Jersey, Miami, Switzerland, Monte Carlo and Haiti.

References

External links 
Leonel Jules Official Website
Art-Media
Spence Gallery
Diversité artistique
Black History Month, Mathieu Da Costa
Michel-Ange Gallery

1953 births
People from Port-au-Prince
20th-century Canadian painters
Canadian male painters
21st-century Canadian painters
Artists from Montreal
Black Canadian artists
Haitian Quebecers
Haitian emigrants to Canada
Living people
Modern painters
Naturalized citizens of Canada
20th-century Canadian male artists
21st-century Canadian male artists